"" is the national anthem of Kenya.

History

"Ee Mungu Nguvu Yetu"'s lyrics were originally written in Kiswahili, the national language of Kenya. The commission included five members and was headed by the Kenya Music Adviser. It was based on a traditional tune sung by Pokomo mothers to their children.

It is notable for being one of the first national anthems to be specifically commissioned as such. It was written by the Kenyan Anthem Commission in 1963 to serve as the state anthem after independence from the United Kingdom. It was expected that the lyrics would express the deepest convictions and the highest aspirations of the people as a whole.

Lyrics

Notes

References

External links
 "Ee Mungu Nguvu Yetu" in MIDI format

African anthems
National anthem compositions in A minor
National anthem compositions in C major
Kenyan songs
National symbols of Kenya
Swahili-language songs
1963 songs